Saint Georgia (died c. 500) was a virgin and hermit near Clermont, Auvergne. Her feast day is 15 February.

Biography 
The only information about the saint comes from Gregory of Tours, who speaks of her in his De Gloria confessorum (To the Glory of the Confessors). Refusing to marry, she led a hermit's life in the countryside, praying and fasting. She lived and died near Clermont-Ferrand, then the capital of Merovingian Gaul.

According to legend, during her funeral a flock of doves followed the coffin as it was carried in procession to the cemetery. They remained to guard the tomb the rest of the day. Her remains could be found in the church of San Cassiano in Clermont, France.

External links
Georgia at Catholic Online

500 deaths
Year of birth unknown
Late Ancient Christian female saints
5th-century Christian saints
France
France
Female saints of medieval France